La Poste Monaco is the company responsible for postal service in Monaco. It is a branch of Groupe La Poste (France).

History
Postal services in Monaco are provided by France, as assured by the Treaty of Péronne in 1641. This relationship has been interrupted twice, with the first interruption occurring during the French Revolution. By Decree of the National Convention on 27 October 1793, the Principality of Monaco was integrated into the territory of France until the passing of the Treaty of Paris on 30 May 1814. The second interruption occurred just shortly after as a result of the Second Treaty of Paris (20 November 1815), which made Monaco a protectorate of the Kingdom of Sardinia. This led to the Monégasque postal system becoming Sardinian from the signing of the Treaty of Stupinigi (taking effect on 1 January 1818) until the signing of the Treaty of Turin on 24 March 1860, again making Monaco a principality of France, and restoring the postal relationship.

Services

La Poste Monaco operates 7 post offices at various locations within Monaco, including Monte Carlo, La Condamine, Fontvieille, Monaco City (Monaco-Ville), Place des Moulins, Herculis, and Grimaldi Forum.  Post offices in Monaco sell typical postal products, such as postage stamps and flat rate envelopes which can be used to send up to 1kg (2.2 lbs), and envelopes with postage pre-applied. Post offices in Monaco also offer post box services, as well as offering telecommunication services through pre-paid mobile phone SIM cards.

References

External links

Communications in Monaco
Monaco
Philately of Monaco

fr:Monaco#Services postaux